was a Japanese daimyō of the Edo period, who ruled the Takamatsu Domain. Yoritake was the son of Matsudaira Yorihiro and great-grandson of Matsudaira Yorishige, lord of Takamatsu.

His descendant Yoritake Matsudaira, named after him, is a notable of Japanese Scouting and recipient of the Bronze Wolf.

References
https://web.archive.org/web/20120212202052/http://www.city.takamatsu.kagawa.jp/kyouiku/bunkabu/rekisi/NAIYOU/yuisyo/kakukou/matu.htm
http://www.kcn-net.org/bunjo/eishoji/okatsu.htm
http://kanji.quus.net/jyukugo4551/idiom231576.htm
https://www.wikidata.org/wiki/Q11530645

Daimyo
Tokugawa clan
Year of death missing
Year of birth missing